The 1993 IAAF Grand Prix Final was the ninth edition of the season-ending competition for the IAAF Grand Prix track and field circuit, organised by the International Association of Athletics Federations. It was held on 10 September at the Crystal Palace National Sports Centre in London, United Kingdom.

Sergey Bubka (pole vault) and Sandra Farmer-Patrick (400 metres hurdles) were the overall points winners of the tournament. This made Bubka the second man (and ultimately the last) to repeat as winner of the series, following the achievement set by Saïd Aouita. The 1993 edition marked a change in the rules, where the winners at the Grand Prix Final were declared the series winner for their event. Previously, the athlete with the most points in an event throughout the season was declared the series winner in the discipline, regardless of their performance at the final. A total of 18 athletics events were contested, ten for men and eight for women.

Medal summary

Men

Women

References
IAAF Grand Prix Final. GBR Athletics. Retrieved on 2015-01-17.

External links
IAAF Grand Prix Final archive from IAAF

Grand Prix Final
Grand Prix Final
Athletics in London
IAAF Grand Prix Final
IAAF Grand Prix Final
IAAF Grand Prix Final
International athletics competitions hosted by England